Port Renfrew is a small unincorporated community located on the south shore of Port San Juan, an inlet on the west coast of Vancouver Island in British Columbia, Canada. Port Renfrew has a population of 144 (as of the 2016 Canadian census) and has been touted as "the Tall Tree Capital of Canada".

History

Port Renfrew has been the home of First Nations since time immemorial. The Pacheedaht First Nation, meaning "People of the Sea Foam", have traditional village sites in and around the main town centre.

Originally named Port San Juan, the original settlers changed the name to honour Lord Renfrew who planned to settle crofters there. The name change was due to mail being sent to the San Juan Islands instead of Port San Juan and the inlet the town sits beside retains the name. Like many coastal Vancouver Island communities, Port Renfrew has a rich history of forestry and fishing.

Between 1830 and 1925, 137 major shipping tragedies occurred in the immediate vicinity of the entrance to the Strait of Juan de Fuca. This stretch of coastline around Port Renfrew became known as the Graveyard of the Pacific.

Geography
Located at the head of the Port San Juan inlet, Port Renfrew lies adjacent to this natural harbour as well as the San Juan River. The other end of the inlet is located on the Strait of Juan de Fuca near its confluence with the Pacific Ocean. The San Juan Valley lies northeast of the town, surrounded by mountains on all sides.

Port Renfrew can be accessed from Victoria via British Columbia Highway 14 or from Lake Cowichan via Pacific Marine Road.

Climate
The climate is classic oceanic (Köppen: Cfb), because it is close to the Strait of Juan de Fuca towards the interior, the Mediterranean trend of rainfall patterns begins to be evidenced with high annual rainfall (proximity to the Csb), in terms of temperature is similar the Channel Islands. Summers are warm and almost fresh and winters are mild, one of the mildest in all of Canada.

Attractions

Port Renfrew sits at the head of Port San Juan and the mouth of the San Juan River, affording it a variety of recreational activities such as fishing, kayaking, and birding. The surrounding mountains and coastline are home to a variety of hiking trails, most notably the West Coast Trail to the north and Juan de Fuca Marine Trail to the southwest. The San Juan Valley to the east is home to numerous old growth forests and many of Canada's largest and oldest trees.

In town
Government Wharf - western terminus of Highway 14
Tall Tree Music Festival - held annually on the last weekend in June since 2010

Nearby
Avatar Grove - old growth forest preserved by the Ancient Forest Alliance
Juan de Fuca Provincial Park
Pacific Rim National Park Reserve
San Juan River Estuary Ecological Reserve

See also
Jordan River, British Columbia - a small settlement southeast of Port Renfrew

References

Designated places in British Columbia
Juan de Fuca region
Populated places in the Capital Regional District
Populated places on the British Columbia Coast
Spanish history in the Pacific Northwest
Unincorporated settlements in British Columbia